Colin McNeil (born 21 December 1972 in  Lanark, Scotland) is a former professional boxer.

He won a bronze medal at the 1998 Commonwealth Games in Kuala Lumpur, Malaysia, and also competed in the 2002 Commonwealth Games.

McNeil began boxing professionally late in his life, making his debuting during 2004 at the age of 32. He participated in The Contender Challenge: UK vs. USA, facing Cornelius Bundrage. He was also scheduled to face his Contender team-mate, Ross Minter in June 2007.

References

1972 births
Living people
Boxers at the 2002 Commonwealth Games
Boxers at the 1998 Commonwealth Games
Commonwealth Games bronze medallists for Scotland
Scottish male boxers
Commonwealth Games medallists in boxing
Sportspeople from Lanark
Light-middleweight boxers
Medallists at the 1998 Commonwealth Games